Deichbrand is a music festival that takes place in or near Cuxhaven, usually every July/August. The festival and its guests are generally associated with metal, emo, rock, pop, and hip-hop. Deichbrand was sold out in advance for the first time, with an attendance of about 18,000 people in 2011.

History and venues 

Deichbrand was founded by Marc Engelke and Daniel Schneider, creating a festival highlight for young people around the sea region. The first edition of the festival took place at Fort Kugelbake (northernmost spot of Lower Saxony), Cuxhaven, on September 2, 2005, and was attended by 500 people. Acts for the first edition included Die Apokalyptischen Reiter, Lost Dayz, and much more. Daily tickets were sold for €12.

„It´s a long way to the top if you wanna Rock´n´Roll!“ was the slogan of Deichbrand in 2006. The festival organization was in the red, but Deichbrand took place just of the dike between Cuxhaven and Altenbruch. In 2006, the event was attended by 4,000 people and included acts such as Revolverheld or Schandmaul. The festival was supported by volunteers and sponsored by companies like Veltins. The 3rd edition of Deichbrand took place on August 24, 2007. Since 2007 the event had been holding 2 stages, Fire Stage and Water Stage. In 2007, Deichbrand took place in a new location close to the old of 2006.
Since 2009, after annual location changes, Deichbrand had been well established at sea-airport Cuxhaven/Nordholz. Nowadays, Deichbrand focuses more and more on international acts such as Mando Diao or Dropkick Murphys.

Past dates and lineups

2005
The first Deichbrand festival took place on 2 and 3 September 2005 at Fort Kugelbake, Cuxhaven. The first edition included acts such as Mob Rules, Regicide, Die Familie, Die Apokalyptischen Reiter or The Jinxs.

2006

The second Deichbrand took place on 18 and 19 August 2006. This time the festival was located at Grodener Deich, between Cuxhaven’s fish harbor and an offshore test area. Because of the big success of last year the organizers invited more famous bands to the festival.

Revolverheld
Schandmaul
Drone
Brainstorm
The Jinxs
Pussy Galore
Mystic Prophecy
Regicide
Maroon
Kasa
A Chinese Restaurant
Die Familie
Experience X
Finisterre
From Behind
Gas
Immortal Sin
Kerndrift
Kokusu
Liquid Fire
Lost Dayz
Maggers United
Mary Bleeds Wine
Muff
Nayled
Nirgendwo
Odeon
Poolstar
Presence Of Mind
Pussy Galore
Remirra
Sandro
Scufx
Subsonic
The Aurora Project
The Marble Index
Tuesdays Hangover
Ötteband

In 2006 the festival was sponsored by companies like Veltins V+, Gizeh, WOM, Natural American Spirit, and more.

2007

The 3rd festival took place between 24 and 25 August 2007. The festival became more and more famous across the borders.

H-Blockx
Subway to Sally
Madsen
The Films
iO ex Guano Apes
Gods of Blitz
Kim Frank
Klee
Volbeat
Days in Grief
Karpatenhund
Schrottgrenze
One Fine Day
Regicide
Fire in the Attic
Neuser
5BUGS
The Jinxs
Loz Tinitoz
A Chinese Restaurant
Gas
From Behind
Tiny-Y-Son
Kill Fill
Mad Lane
Crack'n Up's
Presence of mind

Debuts

Subway to Sally played a few songs before they released their new album Bastard. All in all, were more than 7500 visitors at Deichbrand.

2008

The 4th and until now longest festival took place between 22 and 24 August 2008.

Sportfreunde Stiller
Donots
Deichkind
Oomph!
Die Happy
Tomte
Turbostaat
4Lyn
Blackmail
Jennifer Rostock
EL*KE
Empty Trash
Escapado
Kilians
Trashmonkeys
Letzte Instanz
Grand Avenue
Die Schröders
Monsters of Liedermaching
Blind
Roman Fischer
Tiny-Y-Son
Übermutter
Revolving Door
Odeville
Pilefunk
Krieger
A Chinese Restaurant
Dramaking
Muff
Crossing
Immortal Sin
Till the Extase
Kill Fill

2009

Mando Diao
ASP
4Lyn
Lotto King Karl
Jennifer Rostock
Luxuslärm
Dúné
Emil Bulls
Ignite
Coppelius
Monsters of Liedermaching
The Streets
Dropkick Murphys
Selig
Polarkreis 18
Eisbrecher
Apoptygma Berzerk
The Disco Boys
Northern Lite
Smoke Blow
Chapeau Claque
P:lot
Grossstadtgeflüster
Boppin’B
Trashmonkeys
Sugarplum Fairy
Bosse
Olli Schulz
Fertig, los!
One Fine Day
Auletta
Black Sheep
Leavin' Soho
Space Off
The Swindle
Kim?
Loz Tinitoz
mp3.de Newcomer

2010

Deichbrand took place at Seeflughafen Cuxhaven/Nordholz, near Wanhöden, between 16 and 18 July 2010.

A Chinese Restaurant
Blumentopf
Dúné
Heaven Shall Burn
Jochen Distelmeyer
Love Many Feet
Männerurlaub
Skindred
The Sounds
Tocotronic
An Horse
Danko Jones
Good Shoes
Hey Today
Kafkas
Martin Jondo
Ohrbooten
Subway to Sally
The Swindle
Vive La Fete
Bela B.
Die Apokalyptischen Reiter
Grand Avenue
Itchy Poopzkid
Leavin' Soho
Milk feat. Billy Popolus
Papa Roach
The Disco Boys
The Welcome Dynasty
Wayne Jackson
Blood Red Shoes
Digitalism DJ Set
Grossstadtgeflüster
Jan Delay & Disko No.1
Livingston
Monsters of Liedermaching
Revolverheld
The Downfall Ends
Timid Tiger

2011

Deichbrand took place at Seeflughafen Cuxhaven/Nordholz, near Wanhöden, between the 22 and 24 July 2011.

Adept
Blackmail
Boy Hits Car
Heaven Shall Burn
Das Beben
DJ Thomilla feat. Sante
Emil Bulls
In Extremo
Le Fly
Pennywise
The Dreams
Aura
Boogee Munstaz
Broilers
Die Fantastischen Vier
Donots
Frida Gold
Jennifer Rostock
Liedfett
Skunk Anansie
The Koletzkis
Wirtz
Bad Religion
Boris Dlugosch
Bullet For My Valentine
Fotos
Egotronic
Ghost of Tom Joad
Juli
Milk & Sugar
Suffocating Sight
The Love Bülow
Beige
Bosse
Callejon
Die Happy
Elektrizzl
Guano Apes
Kettcar
Montreal
The Bosshoss
Westbam

2012

The 8th Deichbrand took place between 20 and 22 July 2012, at Seeflughafen Cuxhaven/Nordholz, near Wanhöden.

Adolar
Caliban
Dick Brave & The Backbeats
Frittenbude
Immortal Sin
Ignite
Kellermensch
Oomph!
Samy Deluxe & Band
The Subways
Vierkanttretlager
ASP
Clueso
Egotronic
Fritz Kalkbrenner
Irie Révoltés
Lexy & K-Paul
Regicide
Sunrise Avenue
The Koletzkis
Within Temptation
Beatsteaks
D-A-D
Eisbrecher
H-Blockx
Johannes Strate
Mono Inc.
Russkaja
Supershirt
Turbostaat
Betontod
Deichkind
Fiva & das Phantom Orchester
Heaven Shall Burn

Monsters of Liedermaching
Saltatio Mortis
The Sounds
Turntablerocker

A few gigs such as Frittenbude or Die Orsons on Friday were canceled last-minute because of a damaged stage. The stage was damaged by a cyclone.

2013

The 9th Deichbrand took place between 18 and 21 July 2013, at Seeflughafen Cuxhaven/Nordholz.

Die Toten Hosen
Casper
Broilers
In Flames
Kraftklub
Tocotronic
Madsen
Anti-Flag
Jennifer Rostock
Royal Republic
Frittenbude
H-Blockx
Bosse
Frida Gold
Blumentopf
Comeback Kid

2018

The 14th Deichbrand took place between 19 and 22 July 2019, at Seeflughafen Cuxhaven/Nordholz. Around 55.000 people attended the festival.

Die Toten Hosen
The Killers
Casper
Wolfmother
Clueso
Amy Macdonald
Bosse
Alligatoah
Mando Diao
Milky Chance
Freundeskreis
Kettcar
Kontra K
257er
Von wegen Lisbeth

References

Rock festivals in Germany